Crotone-Sant'Anna Airport (Italian: Aeroporto di Crotone-Sant'Anna)  is a minor Italian domestic airport serving Crotone in Calabria.

Facilities
The small airport features one two-storey passenger terminal building and a single runway. The terminal's main floor features the arrivals and departures areas as well as some basic passenger facilities while the upper level contains administration offices. The apron features three stands for mid-sized aircraft such as the Boeing 737-800 directly in front of the terminal building which are used by walk-boarding as well as four more bus-boarding stands to the north of the terminal.

Airlines and destinations
The following airlines operate regular scheduled, seasonal and charter flights to and from Crotone:

Statistics

Access
The airport is located next to European route E90 south of Crotone. The city can be reached by local bus service (Romano Bus Lines); a taxi rank and car hire agencies are also available.

See also
List of airports in Italy

References

External links

 
 

Airports in Italy
Airport
Transport in Calabria
Buildings and structures in the Province of Crotone